Equestrian events were included in the 1963 Pan American Games. The United States team won five gold medals.

Events

See also 
 Equestrian at the 1964 Summer Olympics

References 

  .
 

1963
1963 Pan American Games
Pan American Games
Equestrian sports competitions in Brazil